Beau is a given name, nickname and surname. Notable people with the name include:

Given name
Beau Belga (born 1986), Filipino basketball player
Beau Bennett (born 1991), American hockey player
Beau Benzschawel (born 1996) American football player
Beau Bokan (born 1981), American musician and songwriter
Beau Boulter (born 1942), former Congressman from Texas and political lobbyist
Beau Brady (born 1981), Australian actor
Beau Brinkley (born 1990), American football player
Beau Burchell (born 1978), American musician and record producer
Beau Casson (born 1982), Australian cricketer
Beau Champion (born 1986), Australian Rugby League player
Beau Falloon (born 1987), Australian Rugby League player
Beau Garrett (born 1982), American actress
Beau Henry (born 1990), Australian Rugby League footballer
Beau Hoopman (born 1980), American rower and Olympic gold medalist
Beau Kazer (born 1951), Canadian actor
Beau Landry (born 1991), Canadian football player
Beau Maister (born 1986), Australian rules footballer 
Beau McCoy (born 1980), Nebraska state senator
Beau McDonald (born 1979), Australian rules footballer
Beau Mirchoff (born 1989), American-born Canadian actor
Beau Nunn (born 1995), American football player
Beau Robinson (born 1986), Australian rugby union footballer
Beau Ryan (born 1985), Australian Rugby League player and comedian
Beau Sia (born 1976), American poet
Beau Smith (born 1954), American comic book writer and columnist
Beau Waters (born 1986), Australian rules footballer

Nickname
Beau Bell (1907–1977), Major League Baseball outfielder
Beau Biden (1969–2015), American lawyer, soldier and politician
Beau Bridges (born 1941), American actor
Beau Brummell (1778–1840), arbiter of men's fashion in Regency England
Beau Correll (born 1982), American lawyer and political commentator
Beau Nash (1674–1762), dandy and leader of fashion in 18th-century Britain
Jimmy Walker (1881–1946), mayor of New York also known as Beau James
Beau James, stage name of lawyer-actor James "Beau" Brincefield

Surname
Heinie Beau (1911–1987), American jazz composer, arranger, saxophonist and clarinetist

Fictional characters
Michael "Beau" Geste, the protagonist of the novel Beau Geste and numerous adaptations
Beau, a paranoid man portrayed by Joaquin Phoenix in the comedy horror movie Beau Is Afraid
Beau Felton, a homicide detective on the American television show Homicide: Life on the Street
Beauregard "Beau" Gray, a supporting character in the video game Red Dead Redemption 2
Beau Richardson, a villain and murder victim on the crime/mystery serial The Edge of Night
Beau, a mining engine who works near the Grand Canyon from Thomas and Friends: Big World! Big Adventures!

See also 
 
 
 Bo (given name)
 Bo (surname)

Lists of people by nickname
Nicknames
Masculine given names
Feminine given names
Unisex given names
English masculine given names
English feminine given names
English unisex given names